Servant of the People (sometimes translated as Servant of the Nation) is a Ukrainian political satire comedy television series created and produced by Volodymyr Zelenskyy, who stars as Vasily Petrovych Goloborodko, a high-school history teacher in his thirties who is unexpectedly elected President of Ukraine after a viral video filmed by one of his students shows him making a profane rant against government corruption in his country. The series ran for three seasons from 2015 to 2019, and a film adaptation was released in 2016.

The series was produced by Kvartal 95, which was founded by Zelenskyy. It would become much more involved in Ukraine's actual politics; on 31 March 2018, a political party named after the television series was registered with the Ministry of Justice, and Zelenskyy was elected President of Ukraine on 21 April 2019, with over 70 percent of the second-round vote.

Plot 
After being filmed by a student engaged in a profane rant about corruption in Ukraine and the student uploading the footage to YouTube, Vasily Petrovych Goloborodko (Volodymyr Zelenskyy), an absent-minded high-school history teacher who lives with his parents, turns into an Internet sensation overnight. Goloborodko's students launch a crowdfunding campaign for registering his candidacy in Ukraine's presidential race unbeknownst to him, eventually propelling their flabbergasted teacher to political victory as the new  President of Ukraine. While in office, Vasily is confused at his newfound responsibilities, but gradually eases into his presidential duties and decides to weed out corruption by the oligarchy in his government.

Cast and characters

Minor roles

Episodes

Season 1

Season 2: From Love to Impeachment

Season 3: Choice

Development

Production 

 Concept: Volodymyr Zelenskyy, Andriy Yakovlev, Oleksiy Kiryushchenko, Serhiy Shefir, Borys Shefir 
 Scriptwriters: Andriy Yakovlev, Oleksiy Kiryushchenko, Yuriy Kostyuk, Yuriy Mykulenko, Dmytro Hryhorenko, Mykhailo Savin, Dmytro Kozlov, Oleksandr Bragin
 Directed by: Oleksiy Kiryushchenko
 Cinematographer: Serhiy Koshel
 Production designer: Vadim Shinkaryov
 Composer: Andriy Kiryushchenko
 Soundtrack:  Dmitry Shurov, Potap and Nastya
 Make-up artist: Nina Kremeshna-Lavrinenko
 Costume designer: Veronika Yatsenko
 Executive producer: Victor Yarish
 Creative producer: Yuri Kostyuk
 Producers:  Volodymyr Zelenskyy, Borys Shefir, Serhiy Shefir, Andriy Yakovlev, Oleksiy Kiryushchenko

Release 
Servant of the People aired on the 1+1 channel in Ukraine. The studio also posted all episodes for free on YouTube. The first season of the show was added to Netflix in select countries in 2017. Sometime in 2021 Netflix lost licensing rights. In March 2022, after the Russian invasion of Ukraine began, Netflix re-licensed the first season, and in May 2022 added the second and third seasons for 33+ countries. The Netflix release combines the first two episodes into one in both season one and two, resulting in 23 episodes instead of 24 for both seasons.

Belarusian TV channel Belarus-1 started broadcasting the show in evening prime time on 11 November 2019.

The Russian channel TNT aired the pilot episode of the show's first series on 11 December 2019, claiming it did so as "a marketing move to raise awareness of the platform". TNT cut a scene from the episode in which president-elect Goloborodko asked if Russian President Vladimir Putin wore a Hublot watch, a joke referring to a well-known anti-Putin chant in Ukraine.

In the United States, HITN presents the series in a Spanish language version. Jewish Life Television carries the series in its original Russian and Ukrainian languages, with English subtitles.

Sequels 

A film adaptation of the series, Servant of the People 2, was released in 2016. The second season used footage from the film to expand on its plot and was released in 2017, bringing the film into the series' main continuity. The third season was released in 2019.

Impact

2019 
Zelenskyy would later mirror his character's rise to political power in being elected President of Ukraine in 2019. After his victory was announced, Zelenskyy walked onto the stage at his campaign headquarters with the show's theme playing.

2022 
In the wake of the 2022 Russian invasion of Ukraine and Zelenskyy's wartime leadership, the show's popularity received a notable boost. Broadcasting rights have been requested by various foreign companies. On March 16, Netflix announced that season 1 of the series would be available to US streamers again due to popular demand. On May 16, Netflix added seasons 2 and 3.

Broadcasting rights 
During 2022, Zelenskyy won widespread admiration as a resistance figure against Russia and Putin, leading to the series becoming more popular in turn. Foreign broadcasting companies have sought to air Servant of the People on their own channels.

Remakes 
An American remake was ordered by Hulu, with British writer Simon Farnaby involved in its development, though the show was scrapped when Donald Trump became the 45th president of the United States.

A Polish remake is currently being produced by Polsat with Marcin Hycnar playing Zelenskyy's character counterpart . First episode was released on 6th March 2023.

See also 

 Man of the Year (2006), American film with a similar concept, starring Robin Williams as a talk show host who is elected president following an offhanded remark.
 Welcome Mr. President (2013), Italian film with similar concept, starring Claudio Bisio as a librarian who is elected president due to a joke vote.
 Nayak: The Real Hero - 2001 Indian Hindi-language political action film in which a TV journalist is challenged to take over the Chief Minister's job for a day.

References

External links
 
 
 Servant of the People on Netflix (location restricted) 
 Servidor del Pueblo on HITN (US only)

2015 Ukrainian television series debuts
2019 Ukrainian television series endings
2010s Ukrainian television series
Political satirical television series
Russian-language television shows
Television shows set in Kyiv
Ukrainian comedy television series
Workplace comedy television series
Volodymyr Zelenskyy
Works about corruption
Corruption in Ukraine